Thomas Bather Moore (1850  1919) was a pioneer explorer of Western and South West, Tasmania, Australia.

Biography
He was born at New Norfolk and died at Queenstown. He was buried at the graveyard Strahan overlooking Macquarie Harbour.

He was appointed as a Fellow of the Royal Geographical Society. He had been a prospector, track cutter, botanist, geographer and geologist – all mainly in West Coast, Tasmania area.

His tracks were legendary routes through parts of the South West Wilderness, as well as the West Coast Range. He had been considered one of the most experienced of Mount Lyell Mining and Railway Company's track cutters.

Western Tasmania: A land of Riches and Beauty, was dedicated to his memory. In part of the dedication Charles Whitham states:

Naming of Tasmanian landscape
He named many features including Mount Strahan, the Thureau Hills and the Tofft River which runs between those hills and Mount Huxley.

Whitham says in his book T.B. Moore that Moore "laid it down that all western lakes must have feminine names", which Whitham guessed would be ignored by bureaucrats in Hobart. Hydro Tasmania has since created lakes which have names that do not follow Moore's suggestion.

Author abbreviation

Notes

References
 
 
 Whitham, Charles. Western Tasmania: A Land of Riches and Beauty.

External links
 http://www.asap.unimelb.edu.au/bsparcs/archives/P001263a.htm – correspondence between Moore and Ferdinand von Mueller

History of Tasmania
Fellows of the Royal Geographical Society
Western Tasmania
Explorers of Tasmania
1850 births
1919 deaths
South West Tasmania